Jaime García Márquez Patricio Castillo San Juan, better known as Patricio Castillo (18 November 1940 – 15 April 2021) was a Chilean born Mexican actor.

References

External links 

1940 births
2021 deaths
Mexican actors
Chilean emigrants to Mexico
People from Santiago